Kate Russell may refer to:
 Kate Russell (reporter), English technology reporter
 Kate Elizabeth Russell, American author
 Katharine Russell, Viscountess Amberley (1844–1874), known as Kate, British suffragist and mother of Bertrand Russell
 Lady Katharine Tait (born 1923), née Russell, essayist and daughter of Bertrand Russell

See also
 Katherine Russell (disambiguation)